Towqdar (also Romanized as Ţowqdār and Tūqdār; also known as Ţowq Vār) is a village in Rudpey-ye Shomali Rural District, in the Central District of Sari County, Mazandaran Province, Iran. At the 2006 census, its population was 893, in 235 families.

References 

Populated places in Sari County